André-Elzéard d'Arbaud de Jouques (1676–1744) was a French aristocrat, lawyer and public official.

Biography

Early life
André-Elzéard d'Arbaud was born in 1676. His father was Jacques Arbaud.

Career
He received the hereditary marquisate of Jouques in 1702, as well as the Lordship of Gardanne.

He served as an Advisor in the Parliament of Aix-en-Provence. In 1740, he served as its Président à mortier.

After his widowed mother purchased the Hôtel de Valbelle-Meyrargues on the Cours Mirabeau in 1695, he purchased the adjacent Hôtel de Séguiran and converted both hôtels particuliers into the Hôtel d'Arbaud-Jouques designed by the architect Jean-Baptiste Franque (1683-1758). It is now listed as a monument historique. Moreover, his portrait was painted by Michel-François Dandré-Bardon (1700–1785).

Personal life
In 1697, he married Anne de Citrany, daughter of Joseph de Citrany. They had four sons:
Jean-Joseph-Augustin d'Arbaud de Jouques (1703-1775). He married Françoise-Lucrère-Cécile de Renaud, daughter of Jean de Renaud. They had two sons:
André-Elzéard d'Arbaud de Jouques II.
Joseph Bache d'Arbaud de Jouques.
Gaspard d'Arbaud de Jouques.
François-Casimir d'Arbaud de Jouques.
Bache-Elzéar-Alexandre d'Arbaud de Jouques (1720-1793).

He died in 1744.

References

1676 births
1744 deaths
People from Aix-en-Provence
Provencal nobility